Al-Alūm is a sub-district located in the Al-Mawasit District, Taiz Governorate, Yemen. Al-Aʿlūm had a population of 5,804 according to the 2004 census.

Villages
ʿAfilah
Al-Bahim
Az-Zurbiah
Miqshar
Shaʿb Zariʿa
Al-Dhiraʿ
Balabil

References

Sub-districts in Al-Mawasit District